The following is the list of characters from That Time I Got Reincarnated as a Slime.

Main characters

A 37 year old human on Earth who was reincarnated as a powerful slime due to certain requests he unintentionally made as he died. After he became a slime, he possesses the Unique Skill Predator, which allows him to eat almost anything and obtain skills and items originally from the devoured object. He can even mimic the appearance of any item or creature he has devoured. After befriending the Storm Dragon Veldora, he was given the name "Rimuru"; Rimuru, in turn, gave Veldora and himself the surname Tempest. After defeating the Orc Lord, he established the Jura-Tempest Federation, a nation of monsters in Great Forest of Jura that seeks co-existence of monsters with other living races. Being a slime with never seen before abilities, his level of threat cannot be measured. Rimuru's immortality is said to be of a special kind in that he will continue to live till the end of time, eventually ascending into a True Demon Lord.
 / 

The Great Sage is one of Rimuru's two original unique skills. She has the capability to scrutinize abilities of other beings, and once Rimiru consumes them, to also deconstruct and reconstruct abilities to higher forms. She also acts as an adviser for Rimuru and also has an attitude of her own; she is the one to whom Satoru made the requests.  When taking over Rimuru/Satoru's body, Great Sage takes the form of a young lady appearance in Rimuru's human form.

One of the four original True Dragons, the Storm Dragon. He befriended and named Rimuru shortly after his reincarnation as a slime. Veldora was trapped in an "Infinite Prison" by a beautiful Hero later revealed to be Chloe in the past, when he was distracted by her looks. He was freed by Rimuru when he consumed him so that they could jointly analyze the Infinite Prison spell to break it. He is classified as a "Catastrophe-level" threat.

Shizue, also known by her nickname , is a Japanese girl who was summoned into this world, during the Bombing of Tokyo. Her summoning was considered a failure, and she was abandoned after having a fire spirit, Ifrit, bound to her body. Soon after, she gained the title "Conqueror of Flames". Shizu is actually of elderly age, but has not outwardly aged past her prime thanks to Ifrit's possession. She figures out that Rimuru was also once from Japan and in their short time together, they become good friends. Before passing away, she requested her body be devoured by Rimuru, giving him a human form.

Great Jura Forest

Goblins

Gobta is a small hobgoblin who serves Rimuru as the leader of goblin riders. Despite how younger, smaller and dumber he looks than other hobgoblins, he unexpectedly holds great proficiency in sword-skills enough to take down a big monster. Hakuro noted Gobta has talent worth nurturing. He ends up being a comedy relief, but nevertheless a competent fighter, not only as a swordsman, but as a magic user as well.

Rigurd is the sub-leader of the goblins in Tempest. Rigurd tends to be the comic relief due to his loyalty to Rimuru making him act silly at times. Along with Rimuru's evolution, he evolves to Goblin King status and becomes a sort of diplomat as well as leader of Rimuru city while Rimuru himself is away.

Gobzo is an aloof and reserved small goblin, slightly taller than Gobta. He is one of the goblin riders trained by Hakurou, who secretly has a crush on Shion. He becomes the target of Kirara's provocation when her group arrives in Tempest to instigate war and sacrifices himself to protect Shuna from Shōgo. Upon Rimuru's ascent to True Demon Lord, he is revived and becomes a part of Shion's troops as those revived from the dead.

Rigur is the son of Rigurd. Rimuru gave Rigur the name previously given to his elder brother to honor his memory. Rigur leads the hunting party for the village's meat supply.

Ogres

 
An ogre prince whose village was decimated by orcs. While leading the six ogre survivors for revenge, he comes across Rimuru and attacks him, mistaking him for the one who instigated the massacre. Upon realizing the truth, he makes a temporary alliance with Rimuru until the Orc Lord is defeated. After defeat of the Orc Lord, he and the other ogres permanently swear their allegiance to Rimuru and are named; resulting in their evolution into Kijin, a rare type of ogre. Later, after pledging eternal allegiance to Rimiru, he was given the title of "Samurai General". He becomes immensely powerful after Rimuru becomes Demon Lord.

 
Shion is a well endowed female ogre who is also a terrible cook. One of the six survivors of the ogre village. She becomes Rimuru's (self-appointed) secretary and bodyguard after evolving into a kijin and shares a rivalry with Shuna for Rimuru's attention. She is a great fighter, but often speaks out of turn, comically forcing Rimuru to take action to save face. She was given the simple title "Warrior" after the Orc Lord's defeat. Her strength grows severely from then on, even after Rimuru revives her from death, to the point that Demon Lord Clayman was no match for her.

 
Hakuro is an old ogre skilled at swordsmanship; like Rigurd, he regains some youth after being named. He is given the title of "Instructor" and teaches the art of swordsmanship to Rimuru, Gobuta and the other hobgoblin kids, and other monsters. He was also the teacher of the king of Dwargon; their meeting was 300 years before Rimuru's arrival. Following Rimuru's ascension to Demon Lord, he becomes immensely powerful as well, with his speed becoming unmatched by most people.

Soei is a male ogre. He is a friend of Benimaru. One of the six survivors of the ogre village. His abilities resemble that of ninjas, and he serves as scout, spy and messenger for Rimuru. After defeating the Orc lord, Rimuru gave him the title "Spy".

 
Shuna is an ogre princess and Benimaru's sister. One of the six survivors of the ogre village. She is good at making clothes and teaches her skills to the goblins after evolving into a kijin. Later Rimuru gave her the title "Holy Princess". Despite her traditional role as a healer and priestess, who stays behind in Tempest, she is a proficient magic user, even capable of using holy magic as a monster.

 
Kurobe is a large male ogre who was given the title of "Blacksmith" by Rimuru and works as such. He is the least featured of his companions, only appearing in the spin-off manga; he is even absent from the first anime opening.  He and Kaijin make up most of Tempest’s tools and weapon manufacturing.  When he actually fights, he utilizes a giant mallet.

Lizardmen

 
Gabil is the son of the lizardman chieftain. He is arrogant and always looks down upon others. Ignorant, he is spurred by Laplace to fight the Orc Lord himself, by overthrowing his father, but realizes his folly when he actually gets into the fight. He is saved by Rimuru's interference. For his actions, he is banished by his father and later he decides to serve Rimuru to atone for his sins, but not before being entrusted with his father's Vortex Spear. His name is overwritten by Rimuru causing him evolving into a Dragonewt with wings. He becomes good friends with Vesta, whom works in a laboratory in the sealed cave Gabil and his men use to farm magical herbs.

Soka is the sister of Gabiru. She was the former leader of the guards of the lizardmen chieftain. After forming the Jura forest alliance with Rimuru, her father Abil sends her to serve Rimuru to gain some experience. She evolves into a more human like being after having been named by Rimuru; this was due to her infatuation with Souei and wish to be of use to him. Afterwards, she and her comrades join Souei as the spy-corps.

Abil is the lizardmen chieftain. When he receives news of the pending Orc Disaster coming their way, though courageous, he is mostly lost on how to protect his tribe, until Rimuru offers help. He decides to take Rimuru's help and wanted to stand by, instead of fighting the Orc Lord, until the coup d'état by his own son. He is later released and saved. He banishes his son, so that he may go and serve Rimuru instead. He also sends his daughter to serve Rimuru for a term, so that she may receive experience.

Dwarves

 
Kaijin is a dwarven blacksmith famous for his crafts. He is originally from the Dwarven capital city of Dwargon, and was serving under the king; until he was forced to take responsibly for a failed experiment by Vesta. After he assaulted the minister Vesta for insulting Rimuru, he and his friends are exiled from the dwarven kingdom and recruited by Rimuru to his village. He still holds the king of Dwargon in high esteem.

The oldest of the dwarf brothers who specializes in armor-smithing.

The second oldest of the dwarf brothers who specializes in jewelry-crafting.

The youngest of the dwarf brothers who specializes in architecture. He never speaks, only answering with "mm-hmm" to everything; this habit annoys Rimuru, who often briefly shouts for Myrd to speak.

Other Characters

Ranga is a dire wolf who first encounters Rimuru when raiding the goblin village. Though in the ensuing battle, his father who is the  pack's leader is killed, he, being next in line, chooses to serve Rimuru. After being named by Rimuru, he and his pack evolved into Tempest Wolves, while Ranga himself evolved further as Tempest Star Wolf after using his skill 'Death storm'.

Diablo is one of the seven Primordial Demons, known as "Noir", and Rimuru's strongest subordinate. Having been summoned by Rimuru during the former's ascension to Demon Lord status, Diablo desired to serve him in order to see the "truth of the world". Utterly devoted to his master, Diablo founded the Black Numbers, an organization of demons he has strictly disciplined, which has become Tempest's strongest fighting force.  Several years prior, he met Shizu.

 
Vesta was the former minister of the Dwarven Kingdom. After establishing an alliance with Jura-Tempest Federation, dwarven king gave Vesta to Rimuru as a gift hoping he could help Tempest with his knowledge.

 
An orc who served as one of the Orc Lord's bodyguard; as well as his son. Though he was fond of his former lord, he also understood how much suffering his lord was going through, and hence doesn't bear a grudge towards Rimuru for defeating him, instead wants to take responsibility for their joint actions. After the defeat of Orc Lord, he is named by Rimuru and evolved into High Orc. He is appointed as the lord of other High Orcs in Tempest and a commander of its army.  Despite his gruff appearance, he is good with children just like his father was.

Treyni is a dryad. She and her kind are guardians of Great Forest of Jura. She was the one who warns Rimuru of the arrival of the Orc Disaster and requests him to defeat it. Later on, she forms an alliance with Rimuru to form the Jura-Tempest Federation; though she tricks him into taking the job.  Beforehand, she served under the Fairy Queen turned Demon Lord, Ramiris.

Trya is a dryad as well as Treyni's younger sister. She notifies Rimuru of the arrival of the Orc army. 

A merchant formerly from Ingressia. He moved to Tempest shortly after Rimuru's ascension to Demon Lord. Mjöllmile is in charge of finance and advertising for Tempest.

Adalman is a former holy man from the Holy Western Church, who became an undead wight mage capable of controlling armies of undead and even undead dragons. He was enslaved by Clayman, becoming his Index Finger before Shuna set him free and inspired him with her holy magic capabilities. As such, he joined Rimuru's side and resides in the Jura Tempest Federation.

Beretta originally was a Greater Daemon who was summoned to fulfill a contract of inhabiting a Golem created by Rimuru to be the guardian of Ramiris for 100 years. As soon as they possessed the Golem and were named, they evolved into an Arch Doll. Though they swore to Guy Crimson to only serve Ramiris after settling the debt to Rimuru, they can still serve Rimuru and evolve together with him as he is their creator.

Dwargon Kingdom

The king of dwarven kingdom Dwargon and an old friend of Kaijin's. Known as the Heroic King, he is powerful, wise, and fair. He is a powerful warrior specialized in swordsmanship and was once trained by Hakuro. He forms a friendship and political alliance with Rimuru and his nation of Tempest after realizing their worth.

Dolf is the prudent Captain of the Pegasus Knights and a close associate of Gazel Dwargo. He spends most of his time in the public eye acting the role of a civil servant.

Kaido is the captain of the dwarven guards in Dwargon and Kaijin's younger brother. He quickly befriended Rimuru after the latter provided his highly potent healing potions to save Garm's group. Whenever Rimuru and his friends are in Dwargon, they tend to hang out in the elven brothel.

Blumund Kingdom

Guild Master of the Free Guild in the smaller Eastern nation of Blumund Kingdom. He is often shocked to the point he literal loses his color whenever something happens in Tempest.

Velyard is one of Blumund's ministers and the one, who usually assigns the missions to Fuze.

Kabal's Party

A male human adventurer in the Fighter class. He is the leader of the adventurer party simply known as Kabal's Party, consisting of himself, Elen, and Gido. He is one of Shizue's last companions and one of Rimuru's first human friends as a slime. Though his party is known to Rimuru as somewhat clumsy (and considered comic relief), they are considered very reliable in their local adventurer community.
 / 

A female human adventurer in the Mage class. She is one of Shizue's last companions and one of Rimuru's first human friends as a slime. She later reveals to Rimuru that she is truly an elf princess from the Sorcerous Dinasty of Thalion, having gone adventuring with her guards/friends.

A male human adventurer in the Thief class. He is one of Shizue's last companions and one of Rimuru's first human friends as a slime. Although he specializes in covert operations and information-gathering, he tends to lead his party straight into monster dens instead of away from them; in short, he's someone who pokes a hornets nest to see what happens.

Kingdom of Falmuth/Farmenas

Youm is the captain of the Falmuth Kingdom's scouting mission of the Jura Forest. He later swears loyalty to Rimuru and takes credit for slaying the Orc Disaster as part of improving Tempest's image. He later weds Myulan, a witch previously controlled by Clayman, and overthrows the Farmus' monarchy with Rimuru's help, establishing the Kingdom of Falmuth in its place and becoming its first king.

Myulan is a very powerful wizard majin enslaved by Clayman, turning her into one of his five strongest combatants, the Five Fingures, having the title of Ring Finger. She seals away magic in Tempest, which inadvertently causes the temporary deaths of Shion and many goblin citizens, but she soon helps Rimuru destroy the army of Falmuth after Rimuru frees her from Clayman's control. She falls for Youm during their short time together in Tempest, and joins him in rebuilding Falmuth.

Originally an envoy to the Tempest-Jura Federation from Eurazania, he is a lycanthrope, who becomes friends with Youm during their training with Hakuro. He also cares deeply for Myulan, and is key to she and Youm admitting their feelings for each other.

A powerful human-turned majin, who has served the kingdom of Falmuth as its most powerful magic user for centuries. He employs the Otherworlder group led by Shōgo regularly to do his dirty work. After assigning them the mission to instigate a conflict in the Jura Tempest Federation, which would make it look like the monsters are violent, the army of Falmuth sets out to invade. During the battle, Rimuru slaughters the army, which begins his evolution to Demon Lord status. After Rimuru uses the bodies of the slain to summon the Primordial Demon Noir into his servitude, Razen is quickly captured by the latter.

A sadistic Otherworlder, who possesses the Unique Skill Berserker. He is bored and uninterested by the world of monsters and relishes in killing, successfully killing Shion for a brief period, while Tempest is stripped of magic. During Rimuru's retribution, Geld brutalizes him to the point, that he kills his companion Kirara to gain her Unique skills. When he still proves too weak, Falmuth's great sorcerer of many centuries, Razen takes his body over, who then proceeds to get decimated by Diablo.

An Otherworlder swordsman, who possesses the Unique Skill All-Seeing Eye, which grants him the ability to greatly increase the speed of his thoughts and perception of the world around him. When Tempest is stripped of magic, he gravely injures Hakuro and Gobta. During the counterattack of Rimuru, Hakuro effortlessly decapitates him, while his skill is active, making him feel his death for a greatly extended period.

A manipulative Otherworlder who possesses the Unique skill to brainwash people with her words. She attempts to trick the humans in Tempest, that the monsters are dangerous, but Gobta defuses her powers. She is later murdered by her comrade Shogo during Rimuru's annihilation of the Falmuth army.

Kingdom of Ingrassia

The true and most dangerous enemy of the whole story. An "Otherworlder" formerly tutored by Shizu, Yuuki was secretly a nihilist who wants to watch the world burn in chaos. Devious and highly intelligent, Yuuki plays the long game to build up enough forces. He succeeded in resurrecting the Demon Lord Kazarim in a new body, and manipulates his subordinate Clayman as well as the Western Holy Church in an attempt to eliminate Rimuru.
 / 
 (Kagali)
 (Kazalim)
A deathman Demon Lord who was the master and creator of Clayman. As a deathman, he must have used his ability to project his astral soul out of his body, when Leon killed him. Yuuki is the one, who hastened his resurrection, working together with the Modest Harlequin Alliance.

Chloe is truly an enigma. Having been trapped in an endless cycle of time-jumping reincarnation, Chloe has been both the student and teacher to Shizu, as well as being the hero who sealed Veldora. In the present this cycle was broken. 

An energetic and brash boy who favors fire magic. He is currently host to a light spirit.

A quiet child, who possesses berserker magic.

The oldest of the Summoned children, he is profficient at using Magic bullets.

A smug girl who loves stuffed toys. Alice can control whatever she wishes with puppeteer magic.

Moderate Harlequin Alliance and allies

The vice-president of the Moderate Harlequin Alliance, a mysterious group whose members all wear clown masks representing different emotions. He is one of Clayman's allies and considers him a good friend. He is the one who provoked Gabil to imprison his father. Despite relying mostly on his skills of manipulation, he is actually immensely strong, as he quickly dispatches the proxy of Demon Lord Luminous Valentine, Roy Valentine in a fit of rage after the latter taunts him about Clayman's demise.

A deathman Demon Lord, known as the "Marionette Master" due to his manipulative, behind-the-scene tendencies; he is also known for removing the hearts of five subordinates, the Ring Fingers and using them as wire taps. He is directly responsible for the plan to awaken a true Demon Lord. As such, he was indirectly responsible for destroying the Kijin's village and the war with the Lizardmen through Gelmud. He believes himself to be the orchestrator of the fall of Eurazania and attempts to set Rimuru up in front of the other Demon Lords, but Rimuru effortlessly kills him.

A member of the Moderate Harlequin Alliance, wearing a mask of anger. He is one of Clayman's allies, often working together with Teare, a fellow Jester. He was the one manipulating the original Orc Lord Geld into slaughtering the Ogre village, later also manipulating Phobio with Teare to resurrect the Calamity Charybdis.

A member of the Moderate Harlequin Alliance, wearing a mask of tears. She is one of Clayman's allies and one of the few people he cares for dearly. She manipulates Phobio together with Footman into resurrecting Charybdis.

One of Clayman's minions, he gave names to the Orc Lord Geld, Gabil, and others to awaken a true demon lord. He was later eaten by the Orc Lord, becoming the catalyst for his awakening.

Yamza is the Frozen Swordmage and the Commander-in-Chief of Clayman's army, as well as the Middle Finger of his Five Fingers. Out of the Five Fingers, he is the only one to not be enslaved by Clayman, having joined of his own volition. During the assault of Rimuru's forces he faces off against Albis and Gobta and they both humiliate him in battle, to the point that he attempts to flee. Clayman forces him to turn into an imitation of Charybdis however, after which Benimaru easily annihilates him.

Kingdom of Eurazania

Carrion is a beastman Demon Lord, a race of demi-humans that possess animalistic features. Unlike most of his kin, he is quite level headed, but he is quick to punish his subordinates. He is a powerful warrior and the king of the "Beast Country" Eurazania. After being defeated by Demon Lord Milim, he relinquishes his status as Demon Lord and becomes her subordinate.

A lamia and the leader of the Three Beastketeers, Carrion's elite guard. She is a formidable fighter, capable of turning anything she sees into stone as well as being adept with poisons. She emerges victorious in the fight against Clayman's most formidable subordinate, the Middle Finger Yamza, wielder of the Ice-Sword.

A reckless panther lycanthrope who is a member of the Three Beastketeers. He went off on his own to attack Tempest, first beating Rigurd, only to be beaten by Milim. He was later saved by Rimuru after being possessed by Charybdis.

A tiger lycanthrope, whose physical power is equal to Shion; as well as having similar personalities. During the conquest to eliminate Clayman, she teams up with Gabil in an attempt to defeat Father Middray, a Dragonewt follower of Milim.

Octagram

The Primordial Demon called Rouge, or Red, he is one of the first True Demon Lords to exist as well as one of the strongest beings in existence. He takes a liking to Rimuru after he learns that Rimuru has gained the Primordial Demon Black or Noir as his subordinate Diablo. He also seems to have some sort of romantic or sexual attraction to the Demon Lord Leon Cromwell. Veldora's older sister, Velzard is one of his closest confidants.

Milim is a dragonoid and one of the strongest and most ancient True Demon Lords; daughter of the True Dragon Veldanava, making her Veldora’s niece. She is also the most carefree and whimsical, only being concerned with interesting things. Milim is known as the "Destroyer", a "Catastrophe" type Demon Lord whose power is the epitome of destruction itself. She befriends Rimuru and frequently visits Tempest, only to cause him nothing but stress and problems from her unintentional mischief; aside Rimuru, she hangs out with her uncle and fellow Demon Lord, Ramiris, who prior to the story was her only friend.

One of the oldest True Demon Lords along with Guy and Milim. Ramiris is a fairy who reincarnates whenever she perishes. Able to create and control an alternate dimension known as the labyrinth, Ramiris guards the dwelling of spirits from would-be trespassers. She later moves to Jura Forest and is allowed to use her labyrinth as a tourist attraction akin to an RPG. She shares a love of manga with Veldora, who crafts them from Rimuru's memories.

A powerful Demon Lord who summoned Shizu. Upon finding that she has an affinity of fire, he had her body bound to Ifrit. Leon is an old friend of Chloe's, but hasn't been able to find her due to a ridiculously complicated temporal loop leaving her existence unstable. He is a rarity among demon lords, as he is a Summoned Otherworlder and a former True Hero, who gained his status after killing Demon Lord Kazarim.

A vampire and one of the oldest True Demon Lords, as well as the secret ruler of the Western Holy Empire, with the lower "Demon Lord" Roy Valentine being his puppet emperor. Having fought Veldora once many centuries ago, her identity is exposed by him during the Walpurgis.

A reasonable giant Demon Lord, who has sparred against Veldora many times centuries ago and managed to stay on nearly equal ground.

A fallen angel Demon Lord who is extremely lazy and tends to sleep all the time, even through most of the meeting of Demon Lords at Walpurgis

Other characters 

A Harpy known as the Sky Queen and a former Demon Lord, who relinquished her status and swore obedience to her friend Milim, after realizing she was weaker than awakened Clayman, who roped her into his schemes, before the new Demon Lord Rimuru annihilated him.

Orthos was an Arch-Demon descendant of Rouge and the true king of the Kingdom of Filtwood. He tried to trick adventurers into a hunt for demons, including Shizue Izawa, where he would actually kill them to become more powerful. The Primordial Demon Noir revealed his presence at the gathering of adventurers, where Shizu fought him and entranced him with her unique mask, which would lead to his infatuation with Rimuru. Orthos attempts to trap Shizu in the guise of congratulating her for fighting Noir and living, but she sees through the trap. However, Orthos proves to be to powerful for Shizu, weakened by her fight with Noir. Luckily for her, Noir arrives to save her and erases Orthos's soul from existence.

An Otherworlder and former student of Shizu. She works as a knight for the Holy Western Empire. She is an immensely formidable individual, stated to be much more powerful than Shizu and Ifrit at age fifteen. During Falmuth's invasion of the Jura Tempest Foundation, Yuuki sets Rimuru up against Hinata, and Rimuru proves to be no match for her at the time.

Roy is the vampire body double for Demon Lord Luminous Valentine, who serves as emperor of the Holy Empire on her orders. When Veldora reveals his master's identity at Walpurgis, he steps down from the seat of Demon Lord and returns to protect the empire for her, after Clayman's demise. Back in the empire, he encounters Laplace fleeing from Hinata Sakaguchi and taunts him about Clayman's demise. Sent into a fit of rage, Laplace easily kills Roy, by ripping his heart out and crushing it.

He is the Archduke of the Sorcerous Dinasty of Thalion as well as Elen/Elyun's father. Upon hearing that his daughter has befriended the newly evolved Demon Lord Rimuru Tempest, he warily arrives to investigate. At the behest of his daughter and old friend, King Gazel Dwargo, he sits down for a diplomatic meeting between Rimuru and all his allies, after which he quickly befriends Rimuru, officially announcing his country's alliance with the Jura Tempest Foundation.

Velzard is the elder sister of Veldora Tempest, thus one of the four True Dragons, known as the White Ice Dragon. She inhabits the northern continent as Guy's closest confidant, not particularly interested in the affairs of the world. She has a particular disdain for Guy's friend, the Demon Lord Leon Cromwell.

Middray is a powerful Dragonewt and the Head Priest of the Dragon Faithful that worships Milim Nava. Unlike Gabil and the other Lizardmen, he is a born Dragonewt, out of the communion between a human and a dragon. During Walpurgis, he faces off against Gabil and Suphia, defeating them, before Benimaru arrives to calm the air.

See also

References

Light novel

 Vol. 1 
 Vol. 2 
 Vol. 3 
 Vol. 4 
 Vol. 5 
 Vol. 6 
 Vol. 7 
 Vol. 8 
 Vol. 9 
 Vol. 10 
 Vol. 11 
 Vol. 12 
 Vol. 13 
 Vol. 14

External links
  
  
  
  
 

That Time I Got Reincarnated as a Slime